Bergamo is a city in the alpine Lombardy region of northern Italy, approximately  northeast of Milan, and about  from Switzerland, the alpine lakes Como and Iseo and 70 km (43 mi) from Garda and Maggiore. The Bergamo Alps (Alpi Orobie) begin immediately north of the city. 

With a population of around 120,000, Bergamo is the fourth-largest city in Lombardy. Bergamo is the seat of the Province of Bergamo, which counts over 1,103,000 residents (2020). The metropolitan area of Bergamo extends beyond the administrative city limits, spanning over a densely urbanized area with slightly less than 500,000 inhabitants. The Bergamo metropolitan area is itself part of the broader Milan metropolitan area, home to over 8 million people.

The city of Bergamo is composed of an old walled core, known as Città Alta ("Upper Town"), nestled within a system of hills, and the modern expansion in the plains below. The upper town is encircled by massive Venetian defensive systems that are a UNESCO World Heritage Site since 9 July 2017.
 
Bergamo is well connected to several cities in Italy, thanks to the motorway A4 stretching on the axis between Milan, Verona, and Venice. The city is served by Il Caravaggio International Airport, the third-busiest airport in Italy with 12.3 million passengers in 2017. Bergamo is the second most visited city in Lombardy after Milan.

Toponymy 
In classical Latin the toponym is attested as Bergomum, while in late Latin Bergame. The toponym in the local Bergamasque dialect of the Lombard language is instead Bèrghem. There are various hypotheses put forward to trace the origin of the name of the city.

The Bergamo historian and politician Bortolo Belotti compared the toponym to previous Celtic and pre-Celtic names, from which Bèrghem would derive, of which Bergomum would then only be the Latinisation; the word berg in Celtic means a protection, fortification or abode.  In the writings of the Latinization period under Roman rule, the toponym Bergomum is explicitly associated with Bergimus, the Celtic god of mountains or dwellings. 

The linguist and historian from Bergamo Antonio Tiraboschi argued instead a derivation of the toponym from the Germanic. The Bergamo toponym is similar to toponyms in various Germanic-speaking countries. Which would mean *berg +*heim, the "mountain home". The hypothesis of a Germanic derivation of "Bergamo"  clashes however with the absence of documents regarding Germanic settlements in the area prior to the settlement of the Lombards who settled in the northern part of the Italian peninsula after the collapse of the Roman Empire.

History

Antiquity
Bergomum (as it was known in antiquity) was first settled by the Ligurian tribe of the Orobii, during the Iron Age period. During the Celtic invasion of Nothern Italy, around the year of 550 BC, the city was conquered by the Celtic tribe of Cenomani. 

In 49 BCE it became a Roman municipality, containing c. 10,000 inhabitants at its peak. An important hub on the military road between Friuli and Raetia, it was destroyed by Attila in the 5th century.

Middle Ages
From the 6th century Bergamo was the seat of one of the most important Lombard duchies of northern Italy, together with Brescia, Trento, and Cividale del Friuli: its first Lombard duke was Wallaris.

After the conquest of the Lombard Kingdom by Charlemagne, it became the seat of a county under one Auteramus (d. 816). An important Lombardic hoard dating from the 6th to 7th centuries was found in the vicinity of the city in the 19th century and is now in the British Museum.

From the 11th century onwards, Bergamo was an independent commune, taking part in the Lombard League which defeated Frederick I Barbarossa in 1165. The local Guelph and Ghibelline factions were the Colleoni and Suardi, respectively.

Feuding between the two initially caused the family of Omodeo Tasso to flee north , but he returned to Bergamo in the later 13th century to organize the city's couriers: this would eventually lead to the Imperial Thurn und Taxis dynasty generally credited with organizing the first modern postal service.

Early modern
After a short period under the House of Malatesta starting from 1407, Bergamo was ceded in 1428 by the Duchy of Milan to the Republic of Venice in the context of the Wars in Lombardy and the aftermath of the 1427 Battle of Maclodio.

Despite the brief interlude granted by the Treaty of Lodi in 1454, the uneasy balance of power among the Northern Italian states precipitated the Italian Wars, a series of conflicts from 1494 to 1559 that involved, at various times, also the Papal States, France, and the Holy Roman Empire.

The wars, which were both a result and cause of Venetian involvement in the power politics of mainland Italy, prompted Venice to assert its direct rule over its mainland domains.

As much of the fighting during the Italian Wars took place during sieges, increasing levels of fortification were adopted, using such new developments as detached bastions that could withstand sustained artillery fire.

The Treaty of Campo Formio (17 October 1797) formally recognized the inclusion of Bergamo and other parts of Northern Italy into the Cisalpine Republic, a "sister republic" of the French First Republic that was superseded in 1802 by the short-lived Napoleonic Italian Republic and in 1805 by the Napoleonic Kingdom of Italy.

Late modern and contemporary
At the 1815 Congress of Vienna, Bergamo was assigned to the Kingdom of Lombardy–Venetia, a crown land of the Austrian Empire. The visit of Ferdinand I in 1838 coincided with the opening of the new boulevard stretching into the plains, leading to the railway station that was inaugurated in 1857. Austrian rule was at first welcomed, but later challenged by Italian independentist insurrections in 1848.

Giuseppe Garibaldi conquered Bergamo in 1859, during the Second Italian War of Independence. As a result, the city was incorporated into the newly founded Kingdom of Italy.

For its contribution to the Italian unification movement, Bergamo is also known as Città dei Mille ("City of the Thousand"), because a significant part of the rank-and-file supporting Giuseppe Garibaldi in his expedition against the Kingdom of the Two Sicilies came from Bergamo and its environs.

During the twentieth century, Bergamo became one of Italy's most industrialized areas.

In 1907, Marcello Piacentini devised a new urban master plan that was implemented between 1912 and 1927, in a style reminiscent of Novecento Italiano and Modernist Rationalism.

The 2017 43rd G7 summit on agriculture was held in Bergamo, in the context of the broader international meeting organized in Taormina.

The "Charter of Bergamo" is an international commitment, signed during the summit, to reduce hunger worldwide by 2030, strengthen cooperation for agricultural development in Africa, and ensure price transparency.

In early 2020, during the COVID-19 pandemic in Italy, Bergamo's healthcare system was overwhelmed by patients with COVID-19. There were reports of doctors confronted with ethical dilemmas with too few ICU beds and mechanical ventilation systems. Morgues were overwhelmed, and images of military trucks carrying the bodies of COVID-19 victims out of the city were shared worldwide.

Doctors pleaded with the rest of Italy, Europe, and the world to take the COVID-19 pandemic seriously. An investigative report by The New York Times found that faulty guidance and bureaucratic delays rendered the toll far worse than it had to be.

Geography

Climate

Cityscape

The town has two centres: Città alta ("upper city"), a hilltop medieval town, surrounded by 16th-century defensive walls, and the Città bassa ("lower city"). The two parts of the town are connected by funicular, roads, and footpaths.

Upper city

The upper city, surrounded by Venetian walls built in the 16th century, forms the historic centre of Bergamo.
Walking along the narrow medieval streets, you can visit numerous places of interest including:
Cittadella (Citadel), built under the rule of the Visconti in the mid-14th century.
Piazza Vecchia
Palazzo della Ragione. This was the seat of the administration of the city in the medieval municipal period. Built in the 12th century, it was revamped in the late 16th century by Pietro Isabello. The façade has the Lion of Saint Mark over a mullioned window, testifying to the long period of Venetian rule. The atrium has a well-preserved 18th-century sundial.
Palazzo Nuovo (Biblioteca Civica Angelo Mai). It was designed by Vincenzo Scamozzi in the early 17th century and completed in 1928.
Basilica di Santa Maria Maggiore. It was built from 1137 on the site of a previous religious edifice of the 7th century. Construction continued until the 15th century. Of this first building the external Romanesque structure and the Greek cross plan remain.  The interior was extensively modified in the 16th and 17th centuries. Noteworthy are the great Crucifix and the tomb of Gaetano Donizetti.
Cappella Colleoni, annexed to Santa Maria Maggiore, is a masterwork of Renaissance architecture and decorative art. It contains the tomb of Bartolomeo Colleoni.
Battistero (Baptistry), an elegant octagonal building dating from 1340.
Bergamo Cathedral. It was built in the late 17th century with later modifications.
Rocca. It was begun in 1331 on the hill of Sant'Eufemia by William of Castelbarco, vicar of John of Bohemia, and later completed by Azzone Visconti. A wider citadel was added, but is now partly lost.
San Michele al Pozzo Bianco. Built in the 12th century, this church contains several frescoes from the 12th to the 16th centuries, including paintings by Lorenzo Lotto.
Tempietto di Santa Croce. Small 12th century octagonal Romanesque chapel.
Museo Civico Archeologico. It is housed in the Cittadella.
Museo di Scienze Naturali Enrico Caffi. It is housed in the Cittadella.
Orto Botanico di Bergamo "Lorenzo Rota" (botanical garden).

Lower city

The lower city is the modern centre of Bergamo. At the end of the 19th century Città Bassa was composed of residential neighborhoods built along the main roads that linked Bergamo to the other cities of Lombardy. The main boroughs were Borgo Palazzo along the road to Brescia, Borgo San Leonardo along the road to Milan and Borgo Santa Caterina along the road to Serio Valley. The city rapidly expanded during the 20th century. In the first decades, the municipality erected major buildings like the new courthouse and various administrative offices in the lower part of Bergamo in order to create a new center of the city. After World War II many residential buildings were constructed in the lower part of the city which are now divided into twenty-five neighborhoods:

Boccaleone
Borgo Palazzo
Borgo Santa Caterina
Campagnola
Carnovali
Celadina
Centro-Papa Giovanni XXIII
Centro-Pignolo
Centro-Sant'Alessandro
Città Alta
Colli
Colognola
Conca Fiorita
Grumello del Piano
Longuelo

Malpensata
Monterosso
Redona
San Paolo
San Tomaso de' Calvi
Santa Lucia
Valtesse-San Colombano
Valverde con Valtesse-Sant'Antonio
Villaggio degli Sposi
The most relevant sites are:
Accademia Carrara
Galleria d'Arte Moderna e Contemporanea (GAMeC, Gallery of Modern and Contemporary Art).

Government

Demographics
In 2010, there were 119,551 people residing in Bergamo (in which the greater area has about 500 000 inhabitants), located in the province of Bergamo, Lombardia, of whom 46.6% were male and 53.4% were female. Minors (children ages 18 and younger) totalled 16.79 percent of the population compared to pensioners who number 23.61 percent. This compares with the Italian average of 17.88 percent (minors) and 20.29 percent (pensioners).

The average age of Bergamo residents is 45 compared to the Italian average of 43. In the eight years between 2002 and 2010, the population of Bergamo grew by 5.41 percent, while Italy as a whole grew by 5.77 percent.

Economy
Bergamo is situated in Lombardy, Italy's northern region where about a quarter of the country's GDP is produced.

Nowadays, the city has an advanced tertiary economy focussed on banking, retail, and services associated to the industrial sector of its province. Corporations and firms linked to the city include UBI banking group, Brembo (braking systems), Tenaris (steel), and ABB (power and automation technology).

Culture

Notable natives

Gaetano Donizetti was born in Bergamo in 1797. He's considered one of the most important composers of all time, best known for his almost 70 operas. Along with Gioachino Rossini and Vincenzo Bellini, he was a leading composer of the bel canto opera style during the first half of the nineteenth century and a probable influence on other composers such as Giuseppe Verdi.

Bergamo was the hometown and last resting place of Enrico Rastelli, a highly technical and world-famous juggler who lived in the town and, in 1931, died there at the early age of 34. There is a life-sized statue of Rastelli within his mausoleum. A number of painters were active in the town as well; among these were Giovanni Paolo Cavagna, Francesco Zucco, and Enea Salmeggia, each of whom painted works for the church of Santa Maria Maggiore. Sculptor Giacomo Manzù and the bass-baritone opera singer Alex Esposito were born in Bergamo.

The American electrical engineer and professor Andrew Viterbi, inventor of Viterbi's algorithm, was born in Bergamo, before migrating to the US during the Fascist era because of his Jewish origins. Designers born in Bergamo include the late Mariuccia Mandelli, the founder of Krizia and one of the first female fashion designers to create a successful line of men's wear.

Sports
 Bergamo's football team is Atalanta who play in the top level Serie A at the Stadio Atleti Azzurri d'Italia.
 The city has a women's volleyball team named Foppapedretti Bergamo.
 The city is also home to the Bergamo Lions American football team, one of the most successful in European Football League history, winning multiple Eurobowls.
 The Olympic gold medalist skier Sofia Goggia was born in Bergamo in 1992. She won the gold medal in downhill skiing at the 2018 Winter Olympics and the silver medal at the 2022 Winter Olympics.
 The Olympic gold medalist snowboarder Michela Moioli was born in a town in the metropolitan area of Bergamo in 1995. She won the gold medal in snowboard cross at the 2018 Winter Olympics and the silver medal in mixed team snowboard cross at the 2022 Winter Olympics.

Theater 

More modern is the tensile structure that houses the "Creberg Teatro Bergamo" with 1536 seats which make it one of the largest theaters in the province.

Another theatrical structure is the Auditorium in Piazza della Libertà. The building that houses the Auditorium was built in 1937 as the seat of the local Fascist Federation and known as the "House of Freedom".

Among the theatrical companies operating in Bergamo there are the TTB (teatro tascabile di Bergamo), La Compagnia Stabile di Teatro, Erbamil, Pandemonium Teatro, Teatro Prova, Ambaradan and Slapsus, Luna and Gnac, the CUT (University Theater Center) and La Gilda delle Arti - Teatro Bergamo.

Education

Transportation

Airport

Motorway
Motorway A4 is the main axis connecting the city with the east and the west of the country, to cities such as Milan, Turin, Venice and Trieste.

Railway
Bergamo railway station is connected to Milan, Lecco, Cremona, Treviglio, Brescia and Monza with regional trains operated by Trenord. The city is also served by two daily Frecciargento services to Rome operated by Trenitalia.

Urban transport
Transport within Bergamo is managed by ATB and includes a network of bus lines together with two funicular systems opened in 1887 ("Funicolare di Bergamo Alta") and in 1912 ("Funicolare di Bergamo San Vigilio"). The Bergamo–Albino light rail was inaugurated in 2009.

Two light rail lines are currently in the planning stage:
 Line 2 Bergamo FS - Villa d'Almè - San Pellegrino Terme
 Line 3 Hospital-Railway Station FS-Trade Fair - Bergamo Airport

International relations

Twin towns − sister cities
Bergamo is twinned with:

 Greenville, United States, since 1985
 Pueblo, United States
 Mulhouse, France, since 1989
 Tver', Russia, since 1989
 Bengbu, People's Republic of China, since 1988
 Cochabamba, Bolivia, since 2008
 Olkusz, Poland, since 2009

Bergamo has a partnership with:
 Dąbrowa Górnicza, Poland
 Bolesław, Poland
 Posadas, Argentina, as Friendship and Cooperation city since 1998

Consulates
Bergamo is home to the following consulates:

  Bolivia
  Malawi
  Switzerland

Notable people 

 Giovanni Michele Alberto da Carrara
 Gaetano Donizetti
 Giacomo Manzù
 Lorenzo Lotto
 Andrea Previtali
 Pietro Locatelli
 Gianandrea Gavazzeni
 Francesco Akira

Religion

Churches
 San Benedetto, Bergamo
 San Bernardino in Pignolo, Bergamo
 San Giovanni XXIII, Bergamo
 San Michele al Pozzo Bianco

References

Further reading

External links

 Municipality of Bergamo official website  
 Visit Bergamo

 
Castles in Italy
History of Bergamo